Runa is an unincorporated community in Nicholas County, West Virginia, United States.

The community was named after Runa McClung, the sister of an early settler.

References

Unincorporated communities in Nicholas County, West Virginia
Unincorporated communities in West Virginia